Rhosgoch railway station was situated on the Anglesey Central Railway line from Gaerwen to Amlwch. It had a small platform on the Down (west) side of the track, the original wooden building on which was replaced in 1882 by a brick building. To the north of the platform was a small goods yard. In the 1970s a private siding was constructed to connect the line to the Shell Oil Tank Farm nearby.

All stations on the Anglesey Central line closed to passengers in 1964 as part of the Beeching Axe although freight works continued until 1993. The goods yard and Tank Farm have been removed but the sidings and station building remains, the former owned by Isle of Anglesey County Council and the latter by a private individual.

References

Further reading

Disused railway stations in Anglesey
Beeching closures in Wales
Railway stations in Great Britain opened in 1867
Railway stations in Great Britain closed in 1964
Rhosybol
Former London and North Western Railway stations
1867 establishments in Wales
1964 disestablishments in Wales